Adriana Lestido (born 1955) is an Argentine photographer. Her black-and-white photographs document the often difficult place of women in society.

Biography
Adriana Lestido was born in 1955 in Buenos Aires, Argentina. She lives in Buenos Aires and Mar de las Pampas. Adriana Lestido studied photography at the Institute of Photographic Art and
Audiovisual Techniques in Avellaneda. From 1980 to 1995, she worked as a photojournalist for newspapers La Voz del Interior and Página/12, and the agency DyN. Photography is a tool that allows her to understand the mystery of human relationships. The basic emotions give
meaning to her black and white photographs of teenage mothers, women prisoners, mother-daughter relationships, and love through abstract and misty landscapes. She has received numerous awards and distinctions including a grant from the Hasselblad Foundation in 1991, the Mother Jones Foundation Prize in 1997, and the Grand Acquisition Prize at the Salón Nacional de Artes
Visuales in 2009. In 1995, she was the first Argentine photographer to be awarded a Guggenheim grant. In 2010 she was declared to be an outstanding cultural figure by the legislature of the city of Buenos Aires.
She is a highly committed teacher and organized photography workshops in Ezeiza women’s prison in 2007. Adriana Lestido is the author of several essays and books including Mujeres presas in 2001 and 2008, Madres e hijas in 2003, Interior in 2010, La Obra in
2011, and Lo Que Se Ve in 2012. In 2010 she was invited by Photo España to exhibit a retrospective, Amores Difíciles (Difficult Loves, photography 1979/2007) at the Casa de América, Madrid and to teach one of the PHE10 Masterclasses in Alcalá de Henares.
Her most recent individual exhibitions include Lo Que Se Ve (What Can Be Seen), exhibited for the first time in 2008 in the Cronopios hall at the Centro Cultural Recoleta (Buenos Aires), Adriana Lestido. Fotografías 1979/2007, shown at the Museo Nacional de Bellas Artes, Argentina between May and July 2013, Lo Que Se Ve (What Can Be Seen), exhibited in 2014 at the Art Gallery, Consulate General and Promotion Center of the Argentine Republic, New York, USA.

Exhibitions
Lestido's works are widely exhibited. In Argentina, they are included in the collections of Museo Nacional de Bellas Artes and the Museo de Arte Moderno, in the United States at the Museum of Fine Arts, Houston, in France at the Bibliothèque nationale and in Sweden at the Hasselblad Center in Gothenburg. Her exhibitions have been seen in Argentina, Mexico, The Dominican Republic, Uruguay, Germany, France, South Africa, Spain, Brazil, New York, Ohio, and California. She won the Merit Diploma Konex Award in 2002 and Platinum Konex Award in 2022.

A retrospective of Adriana Lestido's work was held in 2010 at the Casa de América in Madrid. It included some 160 black-and-white photographs spanning the period from 1979 to 2007.

Selected works

References

External links 

 Adriana Lestido from l'Agence Vu

1955 births
Living people
Argentine photographers
Argentine women photographers
Artists from Buenos Aires
20th-century Argentine women artists
20th-century Argentine artists
21st-century Argentine women artists
21st-century women photographers
20th-century women photographers